Bruce Martin McLaren (born 1959 in Pittsburgh, Pennsylvania) is an American researcher, scientist and author. He is an Associate Research Professor at Carnegie Mellon University and a former President of the International Artificial Intelligence in Education Society (2017-2019).

McLaren's scientific research is focused on exploring how students learn with digital learning games (also called educational games), intelligent tutoring systems, e-learning principles, and collaborative learning. His dissertation research involved building a computational model of ethical reasoning. He has written or co-written over 190 academic articles and holds five patents.

Education 
McLaren received a B.S. in Computer Science (cum laude) from Millersville University of Pennsylvania in 1981. He later attended the University of Pittsburgh, with financial support from a teaching assistantship, where he received an M.S. in Computer Science in 1984 and an M.S. in Intelligent Systems in 1994. Part of McLaren's graduate studies were supported by a Mellon Fellowship (between 1998 and 1999). Finally, in 1999, McLaren received a Ph.D. in Intelligent Systems from the University of Pittsburgh. His Ph.D. thesis was entitled "Assessing the Relevance of Cases and Principles Using Operationalization Techniques". His doctoral advisor was Kevin Ashley. A paper based on his Ph.D. thesis was published in the Artificial Intelligence Journal.

Career 
Upon completing his B.S., McLaren began his career as a software engineer, working for General Electric for 2 years. Later, after completing his M.Sc. in 1984, McLaren joined the Robotics Institute at Carnegie Mellon University as a Research Programmer and then Project Supervisor in the Intelligent Systems Laboratory. In 1986 he joined Carnegie Group, an AI and expert systems company, as a Senior Consultant, where he was responsible for the company's expert systems projects in Europe. He later worked as a Senior Engineer and a Project Manager at the Carnegie Group in the United States until 1998.
After completing his Ph.D. in 1999, McLaren joined OpenWebs Corporation where he first worked as the Director of Research and Development and then as the Director of eCommerce Technologies. In 2002, McLaren left OpenWebs to join Carnegie Mellon University (CMU) as a Systems Scientist. In 2015, he became an Associate Research Professor at CMU.

From 2006 to 2010, he worked as a visiting senior researcher at the German Research Center for Artificial Intelligence in Saarbrücken, Germany, where he did research on collaborative learning, argumentation and technology for analyzing collaborative argumentation. On both the ARGUNAUT and LASAD projects, his research was focused on developing educational technology, using AI techniques, to help teachers moderate collaborative e-Discussions and arguments.

McLaren was elected to the Executive Committee of the Artificial Intelligence in Education Society for a six-year term in 2011. From 2017 to 2019, he served as the President of the society. During his tenure as president, McLaren instituted annual (versus bi-annual) society conferences and worked toward a more diverse society, regarding gender, race, and geography. As President, McLaren was quoted in a 2019 article about AI in the classroom in a PBS article In 2021, McLaren was again elected to the Executive Committee of the society.

McLaren has given keynote talks at a variety of educational technology conferences, including the 2021 IEEE International Conference on Engineering, Technology, and Education (TALE 2021) in Wuhan, China, the Australian Learning Analytics Summer Institute in 2019 (ALASI 2019), e-Learning Korea 2018, and the 24th International Conference on Computers in Education in 2016 in Mumbai, India.

McLaren is a faculty member in Carnegie Mellon University’s METALS (Masters of Educational Technology and Applied Learning Sciences) program and has taught the METALS capstone course since 2016.

Research 
McLaren's research is focused in three areas of educational technology: learning with digital learning games; learning to argue and reason through computer-mediated collaborative learning; and learning with interactive worked and erroneous examples. McLaren has also done fundamental research in how ethical reasoning can be implemented through artificial intelligence techniques, what is sometimes referred to as “machine ethics".

Digital learning games 
Collaborating with Professor Jodi Forlizzi, McLaren developed a digital learning game called Decimal Point to teach decimal fractions and decimal operations to middle school students. In 2017, they conducted a study, which involved 153 students from two middle schools, 70 students learned about decimals from playing Decimal Point, whereas 83 students learned the same content by a more conventional, computer-based approach. In the study, the game led to significantly better gain learning gains, on both an immediate and delayed posttest and was rated by the students as significantly more enjoyable. They later ran several replications of the study and achieved the same results. The replication studies also revealed that the game is more effective in teaching female students than male students.

More recently, McLaren and his team have explored a variety of issues related to digital learning games, including student agency, gender effects, game-based educational data mining, and the impact of feedback and hints on student learning. McLaren’s team has run studies in many middle schools in the local Pittsburgh area with these new research questions.

Learning to argue through computer-mediated collaborative learning 
Since 2005, McLaren has done research on computer-supported collaborative learning (CSCL) and how technology can be leveraged to support constructivist learning. His initial work in collaborative learning involved the semi-automated development of intelligent tutors to support collaborative learning, learning of algebra through scripted dyad collaboration with Cognitive Tutors, and the learning of chemistry through scripted dyad collaboration with a virtual laboratory. This research supported the claim that collaborative learning can be improved with guidance, either explicit direction on steps to take or feedback on domain content, student actions, and/or collaboration.

In collaboration with colleagues and his students, McLaren has developed software tools, using the combination of AI and language analysis techniques, to analyze collaborative argumentation or e-discussions, to help classroom teachers guide multiple discussions and, consequently, to help students learn argumentation skills. In a paper published in 2010, he and his students showed that software classifiers can be created using machine-learning techniques to identify key constructs in online collaborative arguments. A teacher can use these constructs to guide students in debating and learning with one another.

McLaren and his team have focused on developing analysis and feedback techniques, which leverage the structure, order, and textual contributions of arguments, so that the teacher has information to guide and advise the collaborating groups. McLaren and colleagues used graph matching, machine learning, and language processing techniques to analyze e-discussions from high school ethics and university education classrooms. He and his team developed an algorithm called DOCE (Detection Of Clusters by Example) that, given labelled example clusters, can identify similar clusters of student contributions in new discussions. Ultimately, both DOCE and the combined machine learning/text mining approach are used in the context of the ARGUNAUT system to provide "alerts" so that a teacher can, at a glance, see and react to problems in the e-discussions.

McLaren's web-based argumentation workspace and variety of analysis techniques was later made widely available to a range of students and other researchers through another project, for which he, along with Niels Pinkwart, was principal investigator, LASAD – Learning to Argue: Generalized Support Across Domains.

Learning with interactive worked and erroneous examples
McLaren's research has also explored how worked examples, both correct and incorrect, can be used to help students learn. In three separate but similar studies, he and his colleagues investigated whether examples studied in conjunction with tutored problems can lead to better learning.They found that worked examples alternating with isomorphic tutored problems did not produce greater learning gains than tutored problems alone. On the other hand, the examples group across the three studies learned more efficiently than the tutored-alone group; students spent 21% less time learning the same amount of material.

McLaren is among the first educational technology researchers to extensively investigate the learning potential of interactive erroneous examples. In the early 2010s, he participated in several research projects that explored the instructional benefits of erroneous examples. He conducted classroom studies with middle school math students that revealed that students who worked with erroneous examples to learn decimals performed better on a delayed posttest than those who worked with problems to solve. With respect to correct worked examples, he and his colleagues later showed that worked examples can lead to as much learning but in significantly less time than erroneous examples, intelligently-tutored problems, and problems to solve in the domain of chemistry.

Recently, McLaren has been collaborating with Professor Ryan Baker on analyzing the affective states of students as they learn from erroneous examples.

Machine ethics
As part of his dissertation research, McLaren built a computational model of ethical reasoning, specifically a program built with AI and case-base reasoning techniques that retrieves and analyzes ethical dilemmas.  Thus, McLaren is recognized as one of the first researchers to contribute to the research area of machine ethics and, according to Google Scholar, is the second most cited researcher in this field.  The journal paper McLaren published about his PhD work  is often cited within this research community.  McLaren also wrote a journal article describing both his dissertation research and his earlier work on an ethical reasoning system called TRUTH-TELLER. A 2016 CNN article, in which McLaren is quoted, discusses the issue of machine ethics and robotics.

Personal life 
McLaren's parents are Thomas James McLaren, who died in 2012 and who was a Presbyterian minister, and Shirley Martin McLaren, a former high school English teacher.  McLaren was married to Gabriele (nee Huber) McLaren from 1990 until their divorce in 2013.  He has two sons, Patrick Bruce McLaren (born 1993) and Dominik Lukas McLaren (born 1997). McLaren is an avid outdoorsman and hiker; he hiked the entire Appalachian Trail in 1989.

Awards and honors 
1995 – Most Distinguished Paper Award, The First International Conference on Case-Based Reasoning
1999 – Recipient of a Mellon Fellowship during his Ph.D. studies
2004 – Best Paper Award, The Seventh International Conference on Intelligent Tutoring Systems
2013 – Recipient of an Erskine Fellowship, from the University of Canterbury, Christchurch, New Zealand. Spent a semester in New Zealand teaching a course in Intelligent Tutoring Systems.
2014 – Best Student Paper Award, The 21st International Conference on User Modeling, Adaptation and Personalization
2015 – Best Poster Paper Award, The 17th International Conference on Artificial Intelligence in Education
2016 – Best Paper Award, The 24th Conference on User Modeling, Adaptation and Personalization
2017 – Best Poster Paper Award, The 18th International Conference on Artificial Intelligence in Education
2018 – Best Student Paper Award, The 13th International Conference of the Learning Sciences (ICLS '18)
2018 – Best Paper Award, The 19th International Conference on Artificial Intelligence in Education
2019 – Recipient of a Fulbright Scholarship to teach and research educational technology in Chile

Selected papers 
Aleven, V., McLaren, B., Roll, I., & Koedinger, K. (2004). Toward Tutoring Help Seeking. Intelligent Tutoring Systems Lecture Notes in Computer Science, 227–239.  
Ashley, K.D. & McLaren, B.M. (1995). Reasoning with reasons in case-based comparisons. In the Proceedings of the First International Conference on Case-Based Reasoning (ICCBR-95). Lecture Notes in Artificial Intelligence, 1010. October, 1995, Sesimbra, Portugal. (pp. 133–144). Springer: Berlin.
Baker R.S., McLaren, B.M., Huff, S., Richey, J.E., Rowe, E., Almeda, M.V., Mogessie, M. & Andres, J.M.A. (2021). Towards sharing student models across learning systems. In: Proceedings of the 22nd International Conference on Artificial Intelligence in Education (AIED 2021).
Eagle, M., Corbett, A., Stamper, J., McLaren, B. M., Baker, R., Wagner, A., MacLaren, B., & Mitchell, A. (2016). Predicting individual differences for learner modeling in intelligent tutors from previous learner activities. In F. Cena, M. Desmarais, D. Dicheva, J. Zhang (Eds.), Proceedings of the 24th Conference on User Modeling, Adaptation and Personalization (UMAP 2016). ACM, New York, NY. (pp. 55–63).
Holstein, K., McLaren, B.M. & Aleven, V. (2018). Student learning benefits of a mixed-reality teacher awareness tool in AI-enhanced classrooms. In C. Rosé, R. Martínez-Maldonado, H.U. Hoppe, R. Luckin, M. Mavrikis, K. Porayska-Pomsta, B. McLaren and B. du Boulay (Eds.). Proceedings of the 19th International Conference on Artificial Intelligence in Education (AIED 2018). LNAI 10947 (pp. 154–168). Springer: Berlin.
McLaren, B.M. (2003). Extensionally defining principles and cases in ethics: An AI model. Artificial Intelligence Journal, 150, 145–181.
McLaren, B.M. (2006). Computational models of ethical reasoning: Challenges, initial steps, and future directions. IEEE Intelligent Systems, Published by the IEEE Computer Society. July/August 2006. 29-37.
McLaren, B. M., Adams, D. M., & Mayer, R.E. (2015). Delayed learning effects with erroneous examples: A study of learning decimals with a web-based tutor. International Journal of Artificial Intelligence in Education, 25(4), 520–542.
McLaren, B. M., Adams, D. M., Mayer, R. E., & Forlizzi, J. (2017). A computer-based game that promotes mathematics learning more than a conventional approach. International Journal of Game-Based Learning (IJGBL), 7(1), 36–56. 
McLaren, B.M., Farzan, R., Adams, D.M., Mayer, R.E., & Forlizzi, J. (2017). Uncovering gender and problem difficulty effects in learning with an educational game. In E. André, R. Baker, X. Hu, M.M.T. Rodrigo, and B. du Boulay (Eds.). Proceedings of the 18th International Conference on Artificial Intelligence in Education (AIED 2017). LNAI 10331 (pp. 540–543). Springer: Berlin.
McLaren, B.M., Lim, S., & Koedinger, K.R. (2008). When and how often should worked examples be given to students? New results and a summary of the current state of research. In B. C. Love, K. McRae, & V. M. Sloutsky (Eds.), Proceedings of the 30th Annual Conference of the Cognitive Science Society (pp. 2176–2181). Austin, TX: Cognitive Science Society.
McLaren, B.M., Richey, J.E.,  Nguyen, H., and Hou, X. (2022).  How instructional context can impact learning with educational technology: Lessons from a study with a digital learning game.  Computers & Education, 178.   https://doi.org/10.1016/j.compedu.2021.104366 
McLaren, B.M., Scheuer, O., & Mikšátko, J. (2010). Supporting collaborative learning and e-Discussions using artificial intelligence techniques. International Journal of Artificial Intelligence in Education (IJAIED) 20(1), 1–46.
McLaren, B. M., van Gog, T., Ganoe, C., Yaron, D., & Karabinos, M. (2015). Worked Examples are more efficient for learning than high-assistance instructional software. In C. Conati, N. Heffernan, A. Mitrovic, & M. F. Verdejo (Eds.), Proceedings of the 17th International Conference on Artificial Intelligence in Education (AIED 2015). LNAI 9112 (pp. 710–713) 
Najar, A.S., Mitrovic, A. & McLaren, B.M. (2014). Adaptive support versus alternating worked examples and tutored problems: Which leads to better learning? Aalborg, Denmark: In the Proceedings of the 22nd Conf. User Modelling, Adaptation and Personalization (UMAP 2014). LNCS 8538 (pp. 171–182).
Richey J. E., Zhang, J., Das, R., Andres-Bray, J.M. Scruggs, R., Mogessie, M., Baker R.S.& McLaren, B.M. (2021). Gaming and confrustion explain learning advantages for a math digital learning game. In: Proceedings of the 22nd International Conference on Artificial Intelligence in Education (AIED 2021).
Scheuer, O., Loll, F., Pinkwart, N., & McLaren, B. M. (2010). Computer-supported argumentation: A review of the state of the art. International Journal of Computer-Supported Collaborative Learning, 5(1), 43–102.

See also 

 Learning Sciences
 Educational game
 Vincent Aleven
 Ryan Baker
 Sandra Katz
 Kenneth Koedinger
 Kevin Ashley
 METALS program

References

External links 
McLaren’s personal page at Carnegie Mellon University
McLaren’s Decimal Point project page
McLaren’s AdaptErrEx project page
McLaren’s Stoichiometry Tutor page
McLaren’s Math Tutor page
McLaren’s Google Scholar page

Living people
Carnegie Mellon University faculty
1959 births
Millersville University of Pennsylvania alumni
University of Pittsburgh alumni
Academics from Pennsylvania